Quetta: A City of Forgotten Dreams is a 2016 Pakistani drama film directed by Murtaza Chaudary, written by Faysal Chaudary and co-produced by Faysal Chaudary, Sana Bucha under the Production banner Filmsaaz, Sana Bucha Productions. The film star Asal Din Khan, Abdullah Ghaznavi, Ali Karimi, Fayaz Hussain and Danyal Ali in lead roles.

Plot
The film's story resolves around the lives of the people living in the city of Quetta.

Cast
 Asal Din Khan
 Abdullah Ghaznavi
 Ali Karimi
 Fayaz Hussain
 Danyal Ali

References

External links
 
 

Pakistani drama films
Unreleased Pakistani films
Urdu-language Pakistani films
Films shot in Quetta